Rabia Khan (born 5 June 1985) is a Pakistani former cricketer who played as an all-rounder, batting right-handed and bowling right-arm medium. She appeared in 13 One Day Internationals for Pakistan in 2001 and 2002.

References

External links
 
 

1984 births
Living people
Cricketers from Peshawar
Pakistani women cricketers
Pakistan women One Day International cricketers